Terry Edward Draper is a Canadian musician who was the drummer and one of three songwriters for the 1970s progressive rock band Klaatu.

Career 
Before becoming a successful musician, Draper had a construction business with a speciality in roofing.

Draper co-wrote the song "Calling Occupants of Interplanetary Craft", which was not only successful with his band Klaatu, but also became a Top-40 hit for the Carpenters when they covered it in 1977. Draper also co-wrote the Klaatu songs "Prelude" in 1977 and "December Dream" in 1981, which was a tribute to John Lennon.

He went on to record several solo albums in his home studio in Oak Ridges, Ontario after the break-up of the band in 1981. His former Klaatu bandmates Dee Long and John Woloschuk made appearances on his album Light Years Later, in 1997.

Later on in the 1980s he returned to his roofing business, and then developed a career as a restaurateur alongside his continued music work.

Solo releases 

Light Years Later (1997)
Terry & The Twilight Zone: Live... Years Later (1997)
Terrytoons Presents: Can You Pretend? (1999)
Civil War (And Other Love Songs) (2001)
Civil War (Not Very) (2001)
Furzall Family (2002)
Aria 52 - A Five Year Mission (2004)
Stranded (2010)
When The World Was Young (2014)
Searching (2016)
Window On The World (2016)
Remarkable Women (2017)
A Very Terry Christmas (2017)
Once Upon A Memory (2018)
In My Garden (2019)
Sunset on Mars (2020)
Lost (2020)
The Other Side (2021)
Bread and Cirkus (2022)

References

External links 
Terry Draper official site
Artist Profile on Bullseye Records
Searching: The Terry Draper Interview @ The Nice Rooms Webzine.
Once Upon A Memory: The Terry Draper Interview @ The Nice Rooms Webzine.

Year of birth missing (living people)
Living people
Musicians from Toronto
Canadian drummers
Canadian male drummers